Karlo Bulić (12 May 1910 – 19 October 1986) was a Croatian actor. He appeared in more than sixty films from 1947 to 1984. He is most famous for his lead role as Dotur Luigi in the legendary TV series .

Selected filmography

References

External links 

1910 births
1986 deaths
Croatian male film actors
Actors from Trieste